Vasco da Gama was a South African football club based in the Parow suburb of the city of Cape Town that played in the National First Division. Coming from the lower ranks, the club had its roots entrenched in the local Portuguese South African community, and adopted its name, crest and team colours from the Brazilian club Club de Regatas Vasco da Gama.

In 2016, the club was ended when the franchise was relocated to Stellenbosch as Stellenbosch F.C.

History
Vasco da Gama was established in 1980, carrying the name of famed Portuguese explorer Vasco da Gama. Being mainly a lower league club, Vasco won promotion to the National First Division in 2003, after being crowned champions of the Vodacom Second Division. In their first season of first division football they finished 5th, giving themselves the opportunity to build on their previous league performances.

After a successful 2005/2006 season, Vasco featured in the promotional playoffs, beating Bush Bucks in the semi-final. They lost 1–0 in the playoff finals to a Benoni Premier United team, which included Bafana Bafana players Bernard Parker and Tsepo Masilela. In 2008 they won the Vodacom League and regained promotion into the National First Division once again.

Vasco secured promotion to the PSL when they beat Black Leopards 2–1 (aggregate score 3–2) in a promotional play-off at Parow Park on March 7, 2010.

After only one season in the PSL Vasco was relegated finishing 15th on the log and losing the promotion/relegation playoffs.

On 9 January 2014, Vasco da Gama played a friendly match against German Bundesliga VfB Stuttgart at Coetzenberg Stadium in Stellenbosch and lost 5–0 after a brace from Mohammed Abdellaoue, plus goals from Cacau, Martin Harnik and Vedad Ibišević.

In August 2016, owner Mario Ferreira used the license of Vasco da Gama to create a new club in Stellenbosch, known as Stellenbosch F.C.

Honours
National First Division
First Division Coastal Stream champions: 2009–10
SAFA Second Division
National Play-off winners: 2002–03, 2007–08
Western Cape Stream champions: 2000–01, 2002–03, 2007–08
Amateur Club Championship
SA Amateur Club Championship winners: 1988, 1990

Managers
 Carlos das Neves (2008–2011)
  Tony De Nobrega (June 14, 2011 – June 5, 2013)
 Keenin Lesch (Jul 1, 2013–2016)
 Sammy Troughton (2016)

Club records

Premier Soccer League record
 2010–11 – 15th (relegated)

References

External links
 
Premier Soccer League
NFD Club Info

Defunct soccer clubs in South Africa
Association football clubs established in 1980
Association football clubs disestablished in 2016
Premier Soccer League clubs
Soccer clubs in Cape Town
National First Division clubs
SAFA Second Division clubs
1980 establishments in South Africa
2016 disestablishments in South Africa